Northballo Hill is one of the hills of the Sidlaw range in South East Perthshire, and is located near Coupar Angus. It is popular with dog walkers and hill walkers. Northballo Hill is covered in trees.

References

Mountains and hills of Perth and Kinross